Premonition is a 1947 Czechoslovak drama film directed by Otakar Vávra and starring Nataša Tanská and Rudolf Hrušínský. The film was screened at 1948 Locarno Film Festival.

The film is an adaptation of Marie Pujmanová's novel Premonition. Originally Miroslav Cikán tried to make the film in 1944 with Jana Dítětová in the main role, but the production was canceled only after a few days of filming. Otakar Vávra re-wrote the screenplay and made his 1947 version with a different cast. František Smolík played the role of the father in both films.

Cast
 Nataša Tanská as Jarmila Jelínková
 Rudolf Hrušínský as Miloš Toufar
 František Smolík as Professor František Jelínek
 Marie Brožová as Anna Jelínková
 Terezie Brzková as Cilka
 Josef Vinklár as Václav Jelínek
 Antonin Mikulic as Ivan Jelínek
 Jaroslav Mareš as Karel
 Alena Kreuzmannová as Máša
 Miloš Vavruška as Miloš

References

External links
 

1947 films
1947 drama films
Czechoslovak drama films
1940s Czech-language films
Czechoslovak black-and-white films
Films directed by Otakar Vávra
1940s Czech films